Chemist Warehouse Group (trading as Chemist Warehouse, Chemist Warehouse New Zealand, My Chemist, My Beauty Spot) is an Australian company operating a chain of retail pharmacies both locally and internationally. The company is Australia's largest pharmacy franchise retailer with over 350 stores, and employs over 8,000 staff. The company brands itself as offering discounted prices for pharmaceutical goods.
The company also manages a website and a "click and collect" 24 hour dispense either pick-up and delivery service for medications.

Model

The company has been dubbed "the McDonald's of pharmacy" and uses a complex franchise structure to circumvent Australian regulations that limit how many pharmacies a company can operate in any one area. The company's structure allows it to "control" about 400 pharmacies across Australia, and it makes up about 50 percent of the market share. The business model used by Chemist Warehouse is thought to involve minimal equity investment by individual pharmacists who agree to the trading terms enforced across the group. Individual pharmacists working under the Chemist Warehouse umbrella benefit from the bulk purchasing power that comes with being part of the company.

The company had an estimated revenue of $2.3 billion in 2013–14.

The 2013 Inside Retail Magazine Top 50 Most Powerful Retailers list placed Sam Gance of Chemist Warehouse at number 16.

Radio
The company has ventured into radio, creating the Chemist Warehouse Remix with ARN. The radio was publicised as a 'custom built station' for Chemist Warehouse. It is not limited to stores and can be heard via DAB+ digital radio, online, or the iHeartRadio app. The New Zealand affiliate is operated by NZME, and is also available on iHeartRadio.

Criticism
The Pharmacy Guild and pharmacists' union have criticised the company, stating its approach threatens both healthcare standards and employment conditions in the industry. It was also being probed by the Fair Work Ombudsman of underpaying almost 6,000 employees totaling more than $3.6 million in outstanding wages.

References

External links

Official NZ website

Pharmacies of Australia
Pharmacies of New Zealand
Retail companies established in 2000
Companies based in Melbourne